The Snow Mountains tree frog (Ranoidea napaea) is a species of frog in the subfamily Pelodryadinae, endemic to West Papua, Indonesia.
Its natural habitats are subtropical or tropical moist lowland forests and rivers.

Range
This species is known to populate the mountains of Papua, Indonesia, as well as two locations in the Wapoga River headwaters (where the species was found in 1998). One specimen was collected 40 km southeast of Nabire in Papua. It has been recorded between about 500 and 1,000 m above sea level.

References
 

Ranoidea (genus)
Amphibians of Western New Guinea
Amphibians described in 1968
Taxonomy articles created by Polbot
Taxobox binomials not recognized by IUCN